The Venlo–Eindhoven railway is an important railway line in the Netherlands running from Venlo to Eindhoven, passing through Helmond and Deurne. The line was opened in 1866. It is part of the Staatslijn "E".

Stations
The main interchange stations on the Venlo–Eindhoven railway are:

Venlo: to Roermond, Nijmegen and Düsseldorf
Eindhoven: to 's-Hertogenbosch, Utrecht, Tilburg and Maastricht

Railway lines in the Netherlands
Railway lines in Limburg (Netherlands)
Railway lines in North Brabant
Rail transport in Eindhoven
Transport in Helmond
Transport in Venlo
Deurne, Netherlands